Walter Legel (29 June 1940 – 4 July 1999) was an Austrian weightlifter. He competed at the 1960, 1972, 1976 and the 1980 Summer Olympics.

References

1940 births
1999 deaths
Austrian male weightlifters
Olympic weightlifters of Austria
Weightlifters at the 1960 Summer Olympics
Weightlifters at the 1972 Summer Olympics
Weightlifters at the 1976 Summer Olympics
Weightlifters at the 1980 Summer Olympics
People from Bruck an der Leitha
Sportspeople from Lower Austria
20th-century Austrian people